Catherine Brunell is an American actress from Shrewsbury, Massachusetts.

She married actor Christopher Mark Peterson on October 20, 2002.

Acting roles

Broadway

Television

Education 
Shrewsbury High School - Shrewsbury, Massachusetts
Northwestern University - Evanston, Illinois

References

External links 
 
 
 Interview with other Millie cast for Compact Broadway, later featured on NPR

1975 births
Living people
American musical theatre actresses
Actresses from Massachusetts
People from Shrewsbury, Massachusetts
Singers from Massachusetts
21st-century American women